Thiohalomonas is a moderately halophilic and obligately chemolithoautotrophic genus of purple sulfur bacteria.

References

Chromatiales
Bacteria genera